National Institute of Pharmaceutical Education and Research (NIPERs) are a group of national level institutes of pharmaceutical sciences or Pharmacy school in India. The Government of India has declared the NIPERs as Institutes of National Importance. They operate as autonomous bodies under the aegis of Department of Pharmaceuticals, Ministry of Chemicals and Fertilizers.

Institutes

Future institutes
The Eighth Finance Commission in its meeting held on 20 January 2011, recommended establishing NIPER in Madurai,Tamil Nadu and for which, the TN Govt has already allocated 116 acres of land in Madurai. Even after this, the project has been non-starter till now.  In February 2015, Arun Jaitley, the Minister of Finance, announced three new NIPERs, in Rajasthan, Chhattisgarh and Maharashtra. In March 2015 Devendra Fadnavis, the Chief Minister of Maharashtra, announced that the Maharashtra location will be in Nagpur. In November 2015, Ananth Kumar, the then Minister of Chemicals and Fertilizers, announced that the location of the Rajasthan institute will be in Jhalawar. In July 2016, Kumar verified the plans for Rajasthan, Chhattisgarh and Maharashtra, and in the next financial year he mentioned plans for NIPERs in Madhya Pradesh, Andhra Pradesh and Karnataka. Contrary to a previous announcement made in January 2016 a NIPER was not planned in Visakhapatnam, Andhra Pradesh. As of November 2018, the plans for NIPER Nagpur are still on paper only.

In April 2016, the Government of Odisha requested that a NIPER in Bhubaneswar, Odisha be considered.

In June 2019  D. V. Sadananda Gowda, the Minister of Chemicals and Fertilizers, informed the parliament that they had no plan to open new NIPERs in the coming years. He also informed that the ministry has dropped the idea of setting up 3 new NIPERs in Maharashtra, Rajasthan and Chhattisgarh.

Academics

Postgraduate program 

 Master of Science (Pharma.) This 2-year full-time program is offered in different disciplines.
 Pharmaceutical Analysis
 Natural Products
 Medicinal Chemistry
 Pharmacology & Toxicology
 Pharmacoinformatics
 Pharmaceutics
 Biotechnology
 Pharmacy Practice
 Medical Devices
 Regulatory affairs (Pharma)
 Master of Technology (Pharma.)
 Master of Business Administration (Pharma.)

Doctoral/Fellowship 

 Doctor of Philosophy (PhD) - This program is offered in both full-time and part-time
 Medicinal Chemistry
 Natural Products
 Pharmacology & Toxicology
 Pharmaceutics
 Pharmacy Practice
 Biotechnology
 Medical Devices
 Regulatory affairs (NIPER Hyderabad)
 Pharmacoinformatics

References

National Institute of Pharmaceutical Education and Research
Research institutes in India
Pharmaceutical research institutes
Educational institutions in India with year of establishment missing
1998 establishments in India
Educational institutions established in 1998